Patricia (Pat) Rowe (born 10 December 1939) is a former Australian women's basketball player.

Biography

Rowe played for the Australia women's national basketball team during the 1960s and early 1970s and competed for Australia at the 1967 World Championship held in Czechoslovakia and 1971 World Championship held in Brazil. Rowe was captain of both the 1967 and 1971 squads. In 1962, Rowe was awarded the Halls Medal, for the Fairest and most Brilliant player in South Australia. Rowe's daughter, Marisa Rowe, represented Australia at the 1986 World Championship held in the Soviet Union.

References

Living people
Australian women's basketball players
1939 births